Epupa (Herero for "falling waters") may refer to:
 Epupa Falls, waterfalls on the border between Angola and Namibia
 Epupa Constituency, electoral constituency in north-western Namibia named after the falls
 Epupa, Namibia, the settlement at Epupa Falls

Otjiherero words and phrases